The 2005–06 OHL season was the 26th season of the Ontario Hockey League. The Canadian Hockey League adopted the new playing rules and enforcement recently adopted by the National Hockey League in efforts to speed up the game, and make it more exciting for fans. Twenty teams each played 68 games. The J. Ross Robertson Cup was won by the Peterborough Petes, who defeated the London Knights in the final.

Rule changes
Details of rule changes:
 Goaltender trap zone - An area behind the net established to keep goalies from playing the puck in the corners.  A violation results in a delay of game penalty.
Delay of game - Any player shooting the puck out of play from his defensive zone will be called for a 2-minute delay of game minor penalty.
Two–line passes - two–line passes (passes which cross one's own blue line and the redline before being received) are now permitted.  The center red line will be used only to determine icing.
Shootouts - The shootout has eliminated the tie game.  If a game is tied after regulation, a 5-minute, 4-on-4 sudden death period will occur.  If the game is still tied after the extra frame, a shootout will occur. With the visiting team shooting first, the teams will alternate and should there be a winner following three shots (or sooner) by both teams, the game is over. However, if it remains tied, the shootout continues sudden death. The teams must go through their roster before allowing any player to take a second shot. The winning team in the shootout will receive one additional goal in the goals for stats, but all goals scored in the shootout do not affect personal stats for the players or goalies.

Regular season

Final standings
Note: DIV = Division; GP = Games played; W = Wins; L = Losses; OTL = Overtime losses; SL = Shootout losses; GF = Goals for; GA = Goals against; PTS = Points; x = clinched playoff berth; y = clinched division title; z = clinched conference title

Eastern conference

Western conference

Scoring leaders

Note: GP = Games played; G = Goals; A = Assists; Pts = Points; PIM = Penalty minutes

Leading goaltenders

Note: GP = Games played; Mins = Minutes played; W = Wins; L = Losses: OTL = Overtime losses; SL = Shootout losses; GA = Goals Allowed; SO = Shutouts; GAA = Goals against average

Playoffs

Eastern conference quarterfinals

Western conference quarterfinals

Eastern conference semifinals

Western conference semifinals

Conference finals

J. Ross Robertson Cup finals

J. Ross Robertson Cup Champions Roster

All-Star teams

First team
Rob Schremp, Centre, London Knights
Mike Angelidis, Left Wing, Owen Sound Attack
Dave Bolland, Right Wing, London Knights
Andrej Sekera, Defence, Owen Sound Attack
Marc Staal, Defence, Sudbury Wolves
Adam Dennis, Goaltender, London Knights
Dave Barr, Coach, Guelph Storm

Second team
Wojtek Wolski, Centre, Brampton Battalion
Dylan Hunter, Left Wing, London Knights
Ryan Callahan, Right Wing, Guelph Storm
Ryan Parent, Defence, Guelph Storm
Patrick McNeill, Defence, Saginaw Spirit
Dan Turple, Goaltender, Kitchener Rangers
Dale Hunter, Coach, London Knights

Third team
Bryan Little, Centre, Barrie Colts
Ryan Hamilton, Left Wing, Barrie Colts
Mike Blunden, Right Wing, Erie Otters
Matt Lashoff, Defence, Kitchener Rangers
Michael Vernace, Defence, Brampton Battalion
Kevin Lalande, Goaltender, Belleville Bulls
Dick Todd, Coach, Peterborough Petes

CHL Canada/Russia Series
In the ADT Canada-Russia Challenge:
 On November 24, the OHL All-stars defeated the Russian Selects 5–3 at Kitchener, Ontario.
 On November 28, the OHL All-stars defeated the Russian Selects 5–1 at Peterborough, Ontario.

After these two games, the OHL had an all-time record of 6–0 against the Russian Selects since the tournament began in 2003–04.

Awards

2006 OHL Priority Selection
On May 6, 2006, the OHL conducted the 2006 Ontario Hockey League Priority Selection. The Sarnia Sting held the first overall pick in the draft, and selected Steven Stamkos from the Markham Waxers. Stamkos was awarded the Jack Ferguson Award, awarded to the top pick in the draft.

Below are the players who were selected in the first round of the 2006 Ontario Hockey League Priority Selection.

2006 CHL Import Draft
On June 28, 2006, the Canadian Hockey League conducted the 2006 CHL Import Draft, in which teams in all three CHL leagues participate in. The Toronto St. Michael's Majors held the first pick in the draft by a team in the OHL, and selected Kaspars Daugavins from Latvia with their selection.

Below are the players who were selected in the first round by Ontario Hockey League teams in the 2006 CHL Import Draft.

2006 NHL Entry Draft
On June 24, 2006, the National Hockey League conducted the 2006 NHL Entry Draft held at General Motors Place in Vancouver, British Columbia. In total, 29 players from the Ontario Hockey League were selected in the draft. Jordan Staal of the Peterborough Petes was the first player from the OHL to be selected, as he was taken with the second overall pick by the Pittsburgh Penguins.

Below are the players selected from OHL teams at the NHL Entry Draft.

See also
List of OHA Junior A standings
List of OHL seasons
2006 NHL Entry Draft
2006 Memorial Cup
2005 in sports
2006 in sports

References

HockeyDB

Ontario Hockey League seasons
OHL